Kuttiyeri  is a village of Pariyaram Grama Panchayath near Taliparamba town in Kannur district in the Indian state of Kerala. Mini villages of Vellavu, Mavichery, Thalora & Panangattoor are parts of Kuttiyeri.

Demographics
As of 2011 Census, Kuttiyeri had a population of 12,473 with 6,009 males (48.2%) and 6,464 females (51.8%). The male female sex ratio was 1,076 lower than state average of 1,084. In Kuttiyeri, 11% of the population were under 6 years age. Kuttiyeri had overall literacy of 91.3% lower than state average of 94%.

Transportation
The national highway passes through the town of Taliparamba. Goa and Mumbai can be accessed on the northern side and Cochin and Thiruvananthapuram can be accessed on the southern side. The neighbouring village of Pariyaram on the North side of Kuppam river is accessible through Kuttiyeri bridge. Buses are available to Taliparamba, which has a good bus station and from there buses are easily available to all parts of Kannur district. The road to the east of Iritty connects to Mysore and Bangalore. Buses to these cities are available from Kannur, 22 km to the South. The nearest railway stations are Kannapuram and Kannur on Mangalore-Palakkad line. 
Trains are available to almost all parts of India, subject to advance booking over the internet. There are airports at Kannur, Mangalore and Calicut. All of them are small international airports with direct flights available only to Middle Eastern countries.

References

Villages near Taliparamba